Gayn may refer to:
 Ghayn, an Arabic letter
 Gayn, a surname:
Mark Gayn, American/Canadian journalist

See also 
 Gayne
 Gain (disambiguation)